The Texaco Cup, officially known as the International League Board Competition, was an association football competition started in 1970, involving sides from England, Scotland, and Ireland that had not qualified for European competitions.

It was one of the first football competitions to receive sponsorship, taking the name of American petroleum company Texaco for £100,000, and was instituted to help promote Texaco's recent purchase of the Regent filling station chain. Irish and Northern Irish clubs withdrew from the competition after 1971–72 due to political pressure, competing in a separate Texaco (All-Ireland) Cup in 1973–74 and 1974–75.

Crowds in the competition fell after the first few seasons, and it became the Anglo-Scottish Cup from 1975 to 1976 after Texaco's sponsorship ended.

Format
For the first four seasons it was played as a straight knockout tournament, with sixteen clubs entered, all ties being two-legged. For the final season of the competition, 16 English clubs played in groups before being joined in the knockout stages by four Scottish sides.

List of Finals

Source:

NB Finals played over two legs except in 1973–74

Participants

1970–71
 Burnley, Nottingham Forest, Stoke City, Tottenham Hotspur, West Bromwich Albion, Wolverhampton Wanderers
 Airdrieonians, Dunfermline Athletic, Dundee, Hearts, Morton, Motherwell
 Ards, Derry City
 Limerick, Shamrock Rovers

1971–72
 Coventry City, Derby County, Huddersfield Town, Manchester City, Newcastle United, Stoke City
 Airdrieonians, Dundee United, Falkirk, Hearts, Morton, Motherwell
 Ballymena United, Coleraine
 Shamrock Rovers, Waterford

1972–73
 Coventry City, Crystal Palace, Ipswich Town, Leicester City, Newcastle United, Norwich City, Sheffield United, West Bromwich Albion, Wolverhampton Wanderers
 Ayr United, Dundee, Dundee United, Hearts, Kilmarnock, Motherwell, St Johnstone

1973–74
 Birmingham City, Burnley, Coventry City, Everton, Leicester City, Newcastle United, Norwich City, Sheffield United, Stoke City
 Ayr United, Dundee United, East Fife, Hearts, Morton, Motherwell, St Johnstone

1974–75
 Birmingham City, Blackpool, Carlisle United, Leyton Orient, Luton Town, Manchester City, Middlesbrough, Newcastle United, Norwich City, Oldham Athletic, Peterborough United, Sheffield United, Southampton, Sunderland, West Bromwich Albion, West Ham United
 Aberdeen, Ayr United, Hearts, Rangers

References

External links
Texaco Cup (and Anglo-Scottish Cup) results at RSSSF

Texaco
Defunct international club association football competitions in Europe
1970 establishments in Europe
1975 disestablishments in Europe
Recurring sporting events established in 1970
Recurring sporting events disestablished in 1975